The Brothers is a British television series, produced and shown by the BBC between 1972 and 1976.

Debuting with the death of road haulage magnate Robert Hammond, the series followed the trials and tribulations of the company and family/families he left behind, with equal shares in Hammond Transport Services left to each of his three sons and to his secretary (who was revealed to have been Hammond's mistress and the mother of his illegitimate daughter).

Synopsis

The series was based around conflict within the Hammond family over the direction of the family firm, a London-based road haulage business called Hammond Transport Services, after the death of patriarch Robert Hammond. The eldest son, Edward (played by Glyn Owen during the first series and by Patrick O'Connell for the remainder of the show's run), prepares to take over the running of the business, only to find that his father has left equal shares to his two other sons, Brian (Richard Easton), a dull accountant and David (Robin Chadwick), a young graduate - and to his mistress and secretary Jennifer Kingsley (Jennifer Wilson). Storylines throughout the series dealt with plans to expand the business into an international concern, coupled with more family-orientated plots as Edward and Jennifer fall in love and marry.

Other prominent characters included Robert Hammond's hard-faced widow and the mother of the three brothers, Mary (Jean Anderson), who is determined to continue exercising her own influence over her family, Brian's shrewish wife Ann (Hilary Tindall) and David's girlfriend then wife Jill (Gabrielle Drake). Later characters to be introduced included the loathsome financial whizkid, merchant banker and proto-yuppie Paul Merroney (Colin Baker), April Winter (Liza Goddard), who became Merroney's wife, and Jane Maxwell (Kate O'Mara), the tough female boss of an air freight business. (Baker and Goddard later married in real life but subsequently divorced.)

Bill, the foreman (Derek Benfield), demonstrated how the workplace of the 1970s was changing. His elevation from the shop floor to a key member of the board was met with resistance from both ends, and the subsequent decades allow this to be seen in context, one way that management and workers may work closer together to maintain the company's competitive outlook. The character of Paul Merroney can in hindsight be viewed as a prototype for the new Thatcher-inspired generation of corporate go-getters.

The show also featured Mike Pratt playing the character Don Stacey (1975–76). This was the final role that he played before his early death.

After the end of the seventh series in 1976, the show finished. There was no formal cancellation of the show but a further series was never commissioned.

Created by Gerard Glaister and N. J. Crisp, Glaister was also the producer of the series. The Brothers became a highly popular Sunday night favourite with BBC viewers throughout its run.

Cast album
The popularity of the series in The Netherlands (where it was titled The Hammonds) resulted in a Christmas album recorded by the main characters. Christmas with The Hammonds, produced by Dutch TV host Willem Duys, reached number 22 in the Dutch LP Top 50 in December 1976.

Main cast list

Series overview

Episodes

Series 1

Broadcast Friday evenings on BBC1 at 8:10pm

Series 2

Broadcast Sunday evenings on BBC1 at 7:25pm

Series 3
Broadcast on Sunday evenings on BBC1 at 7:25pm

Series 4

Broadcast Sunday evenings on BBC1 at 7:25pm with a one-week break in the series on 24 November.

Series 5

Broadcast Sunday evenings on BBC1 at 7:25pm

Series 6

Broadcast Sunday evenings on BBC1 at 7:25pm

Series 7

Broadcast Sunday evenings on BBC1 at 7:25pm

DVD release

The series is available in the UK as a 27 DVD boxed set released by Simply Media:

References

External links

The Brothers at TV Cream
The Brothers articles by Colin Baker

1972 British television series debuts
1976 British television series endings
1970s British drama television series
BBC television dramas
British television soap operas
English-language television shows